Durval Lima (28 May 1908 – 30 July 1990) was a Brazilian rower. He competed in the men's coxed four event at the 1932 Summer Olympics.

References

1908 births
1990 deaths
Brazilian male rowers
Olympic rowers of Brazil
Rowers at the 1932 Summer Olympics
Rowers from Rio de Janeiro (city)